The Supreme Soviet of the Byelorussian SSR (Belarusian: Вярхоўны Савет Беларускай ССР, Viarchoŭny Saviet Bielaruskaj SSR; Russian: Верховный Совет Белорусской ССР tr. Verkhovnyy Sovet Belorusskoy SSR) was the supreme soviet (main legislative institution) of the Byelorussian SSR from 1938 to 1991. The Supreme Soviet of the Byelorussian SSR was preceded by the All-Byelorussian Central Executive Committee (1920-1938) and the All-Byelorussian Congress of Soviets (1919-1937). The Supreme Soviet of the Byelorussian SSR was briefly disbanded in 1941 due to the Great Patriotic War and was re-established in 1947. The Supreme Soviet of the Byelorussian SSR was briefly succeeded by the Supreme Soviet of Belarus from 1991 to 1996. The Supreme Soviet of Belarus was succeeded by the National Assembly of Belarus in 1996.

Until Gorbachev's democratization program, the Supreme Soviet of the Byelorussian SSR was a rubber stamp like all other supreme soviets of the union republics of the Soviet Union, existing only to provide legal sanction for policies already implemented by the Communist Party of Byelorussia. The 1990 Belarusian Supreme Soviet election was the only supreme soviet election where opposition parties were able to run.

History 
The Supreme Soviet of the Byelorussian SSR was established pursuant to the Constitution of the Byelorussian SSR from 1937, which changed the organization of main political organs of the republic. In theory, the Supreme Soviet was to be a legislative body that exercised power over the legislative branch of the Byelorussian SSR. In reality, the Supreme Soviet's power was limited to approving the decisions of the Communist Party of Byelorussia.

Supreme Soviet elections were held in 1938, 1947, 1951, 1955, 1959, 1963, 1967, 1971, 1975, 1980, 1985, and 1990. In 1990, 360 deputies were elected.

Chairmen of the Supreme Soviet 
The Chairman of the Supreme Soviet was speaker of the legislative assembly. With the disbandment of the Presidium of the Supreme Soviet of the Byelorussian SSR in May 1990, the powers of the Chairman of the Presidium of the Supreme Soviet were transferred to the Chairman of the Supreme Soviet. This changed the role and powers of the Chairman of the Supreme Soviet from 1990 and onwards. The office-holders remained speakers of the assembly and additionally became the de jure heads of state.

Chairmen of the Presidium of the Supreme Soviet 
The Chairman of the Presidium of the Supreme Soviet was the de jure head of state of the Byelorussian SSR. With the disbandment of the Presidium of the Supreme Soviet of the Byelorussian SSR in May 1990, the powers of the Chairman of the Presidium of the Supreme Soviet were transferred to the Chairman of the Supreme Soviet. This changed the role and powers of the Chairman of the Supreme Soviet from 1990 and onwards.

See also 

 Supreme Soviet of the Soviet Union
 Supreme Soviet
 Byelorussian SSR

References 


Historical legislatures
1938 establishments in Belarus
1991 disestablishments in Belarus
Government of the Soviet Union
Government of Belarus
Byelorussian Soviet Socialist Republic
Defunct unicameral legislatures
Byelorussian